William "Bill" Adderley (born February 1948) is a British businessman and founder of the FTSE 250-listed Dunelm Group home furnishings retailer.

Early life
Adderley was born on a council estate in February 1948 in Leeds, Yorkshire. Adderley left school at 16, with a basic education level. He was a boyhood fan of Leeds United.

Career
Adderley was a manager at a Woolworths store in Coalville, but left in 1979 after the company wanted him to relocate to its Skegness store.

In 1979, while looking for a new job, Adderley and his wife, Jean, sold curtains which had been rejected by Marks and Spencer from a stall on Leicester market. In 1984, they opened their first home furnishings store, calling it Dunelm Mill.  He retired from Dunelm at the age of 58 in 2006 and left the growth of the company in the hands of his son, Sir William (“Will”) Adderley, and it was at this time the company floated.

In October 2013, The Guardian commented that Adderley had become the largest private shareholder in Marks & Spencer, having built a stake valued at £250 million.

Adderley sold most of his stake in Marks & Spencer and bought a stake in Morrisons in 2017.

Currently, Dunelm operates in 175 stores across the UK and runs an ecommerce business. The Adderley family still owns approximately 43% of the shares.

Wealth
In 2022, the Sunday Times Rich List estimated his net worth at £1.78 billion.

Personal life
He is married to Jean and has two children. His son, Sir William "Will" Lester Adderley, is a director and deputy chairman of Dunelm Group plc, while his other son, Jonathan, is not actively involved in the business.

References 

1948 births
Living people
British retail company founders
Businesspeople from Leeds
English billionaires
English chief executives
English company founders
English philanthropists